Richard Marco Kovacevich (born October 30, 1943) is an American business executive and the former CEO of Wells Fargo & Company.

Early life and education
A native of Tacoma, Washington, he grew up in Enumclaw, Washington, a lumber town about 30 miles southeast of Seattle, where his father (of Croatian origin) worked in the sawmill. His parents are Joseph and Dorothy Kovacevich. At Stanford University he received BS and MS degrees in industrial engineering, followed by an MBA degree from Stanford Business School in 1967.

Career

Citicorp 

Early in his corporate career he was a planning and division general manager with General Mills before joining Citicorp. At Citicorp he was made head of regional retail banking. Kovacevich was told by his team that Citibank had 30% market share but was losing 108 million dollars a year. Probing deeper, Kovacevich realized that they meant that Citibank had 30% checking account market share (in other words, 30 percent of all people who lived in the Citibank regions had a checking account with Citibank). In reality, Citibank only had 6% market share of deposits (the vast majority of money being in Savings and Loans, Credit Unions, and other institutions). Kovacevich expanded Citibank aggressively into other areas such as mortgages.

Norwest 
He then joined Norwest Bank as chief operating officer and head of the retail banking group in March 1986. At Norwest, Kovacevich confronted a similar situation. Norwest was mostly centered in Minnesota and Iowa at the time, with a relatively small population in both states. Kovacevich realized the only way he could keep growing the company would be to expand beyond banking services, into investment and insurance services as well. Kovacevich theorized that eventually it would be impossible for any bank to continuously grow if it did not do this.

Kovacevich instituted the new strategies while serving as president of Norwest from 1989, chief executive officer from 1993, and chairman from 1995. The higher revenues, relative to stable fixed costs which this method produced allowed Norwest to purchase many other banks, culminating with the 1998 purchase of Wells Fargo.  Although Norwest was effectively the survivor, the merged company retained the better-known Wells Fargo name and moved to Wells Fargo's headquarters in San Francisco.  After the merger, Kovacevich was given the positions of president and CEO of Wells Fargo. In 2001 he was elected chairman as well.

Legacy 
Kovacevich is responsible for many trends currently found in the financial services industry:

 Edit note: none of this was true. These innovations of branch as a retail store (BARS) are the work of John McCoy, CEO of BankOne nna Chase.

 His "leadership style puts accountability for success in the hands of each and every employee".

Wells Fargo 
He relinquished the presidency of Wells Fargo to John Stumpf in August 2005. On June 27, 2007, the board of directors elected Stumpf CEO, with Kovacevich retaining the chairmanship.

In September 2009 Wells Fargo announced Kovacevich would step down as chairman and a director at the end of 2009 and retire from the company in early 2010 after 23 years with Norwest and Wells Fargo. As of October, 2020, it was reported that he still had an office and personal assistant at Wells Fargo.

Other positions 
Besides Wells Fargo, Kovacevich is a former Board of Directors of Cisco Systems, Inc., and formerly Target Corporation. He is also vice president of the board of governors of the San Francisco Symphony, vice chairman of the San Francisco Museum of Modern Art, and a member of Governor Arnold Schwarzenegger's California Commission on Jobs and Economic Growth, the National Infrastructure Advisory Committee, and the Financial Services Roundtable.

Hudson Executive Capital 
In June 2015, it was announced that Kovacevich is a CEO partner and had invested in Hudson Executive Capital, LP, an activist hedge fund.

Theranos 
Kovacevich joined the board of advisors in 2013 and the board of directors in 2016 of heavily criticized Theranos, a now defunct privately-held health, technology and laboratory services company headquartered in Palo Alto, California that falsely claimed to have developed devices to automate and miniaturize blood tests using microscopic blood volumes.  He was also an investor in the company.  Theranos corporate governance practices have been criticized.  Theranos's tests were exposed as unreliable, government regulators found the company posed a risk to patient safety, Walgreens suspended Theranos blood tests in their stores, the US proposed severe sanctions on the company, and the Justice Department and Securities and Exchange Commission began criminal investigations into Theranos.  Kovacevich continued to defend Theranos as "a good company" and claimed the treatment of CEO Elizabeth Holmes was "unfair."

Personal life
Kovacevich is married to Mary Jo and is the father of three children. 

In the political realm, he has been a member of Pete Coors for Senate, Romney for President, the National Republican Congressional Committee, and the New Leadership for America Political Action Committee.

References 

1943 births
Living people
People from Tacoma, Washington
Stanford University alumni
Wells Fargo
American chief executives of financial services companies
Cisco people
Cargill people
Stanford Graduate School of Business alumni
American corporate directors
Theranos people
People from Enumclaw, Washington
American people of Croatian descent